Law of the Saddle is a 1943 American Western film directed by Melville De Lay and written by Fred Myton. The film stars Robert Livingston as the Lone Rider and Al St. John as his sidekick "Fuzzy Jones", with Betty Miles, Lane Chandler, John Elliott and Reed Howes. The film was released on July 20, 1943, by Producers Releasing Corporation.

This is the sixteenth movie in the "Lone Rider" series, and the fifth starring Robert Livingston. The first eleven movies star George Houston.

Plot
Rocky tries to clean out a gang of cattle rustlers, but finds that the leader of the gang is the town's Sheriff.

Cast          
Robert Livingston as Rocky Cameron, the Lone Rider
Al St. John as Fuzzy Jones
Betty Miles as Gayle Kirby
Lane Chandler as Steve Kinney
John Elliott as Dan Kirby
Reed Howes as Dave Barstowe
Curley Dresden as Joe 
Al Ferguson as Bart
Frank Ellis as Vic Dawson

See also
The "Lone Rider" films starring George Houston:
 The Lone Rider Rides On (1941)
 The Lone Rider Crosses the Rio (1941)
 The Lone Rider in Ghost Town (1941)
 The Lone Rider in Frontier Fury (1941)
 The Lone Rider Ambushed (1941)
 The Lone Rider Fights Back (1941)
 The Lone Rider and the Bandit (1942)
 The Lone Rider in Cheyenne (1942)
 The Lone Rider in Texas Justice (1942)
 Border Roundup (1942)
 Outlaws of Boulder Pass (1942)
starring Robert Livingston: 
 Overland Stagecoach (1942)
 Wild Horse Rustlers (1943)
 Death Rides the Plains (1943)
 Wolves of the Range (1943)
 Law of the Saddle (1943)
 Raiders of Red Gap (1943)

References

External links
 

1943 films
American Western (genre) films
1943 Western (genre) films
Producers Releasing Corporation films
American black-and-white films
1940s English-language films
1940s American films